Ždrelac  is a village on the island of Pašman in Croatia. It is connected by the D110 highway. At its northernmost tip, it is also connected to the island of Ugljan via the Ždrelac Bridge.

Populated places in Zadar County
Pašman